The 2020–21 Notre Dame Fighting Irish men's ice hockey season was the 61st season of play for the program and the 4th season in the Big Ten Conference. The Fighting Irish represented the University of Notre Dame and were coached by Jeff Jackson, in his 16th season.

Season
As a result of the ongoing COVID-19 pandemic the entire college ice hockey season was delayed. Because the NCAA had previously announced that all winter sports athletes would retain whatever eligibility they possessed through at least the following year, none of Notre Dame's players would lose a season of play. However, the NCAA also approved a change in its transfer regulations that would allow players to transfer and play immediately rather than having to sit out a season, as the rules previously required.

Notre Dame had an up and down season, routinely following up stellar performances with disappointing efforts. The team hovered around the bottom of the top-20 for most of the season and were never more than 2 games away from a .500 record. After alternating multi-game winning streaks through January and February, Notre Dame was ranked #19 and there was belief that the Irish could make the NCAA Tournament despite being just 14–12–2. A solid performance in their conference tournament would definitely improve the team's chances, and with the Fighting Irish hosting the entire tournament their odds were even better. Unfortunately, the team laid an egg in the opening game against Penn State and lost 3–6.

Notre Dame could only watch and hope but when St. Lawrence won the ECAC Tournament it appeared that the door had shut on Notre Dame's season. In less than 24 hours everything changed; St. Lawrence's head coach tested positive for COVID-19 the following day and the team was forced to withdraw from the national tournament. The ECAC automatic bid was given to Quinnipiac (who were likely to make the tournament anyway), opening up one more spot in the bracket. The final open spot came down essentially to how schools performed against the best teams in their conference; Notre Dame splitting their season series against Michigan and Minnesota gave them the edge and the Fighting Irish received the final at-large bid.

While the team's selection was not without controversy, the Fighting Irish lost the ability to prove they were the right choice when members of the team tested positive for COVID-19. Because their withdrawal happened two days before the game had been scheduled, there was no opportunity for another team to be installed as a replacement and the match was declared a 'no contest'.

Brady Bjork, Ryan Carmichael and Christian DiCesare sat out the season.

Departures

Recruiting

Roster
As of January 3, 2021.

Standings

Schedule and Results

|-
!colspan=12 style=";" | Regular season

|-
!colspan=12 style=";" | 

|-
!colspan=12 style=";" | 
|- style="background:#bbbbbb"
| March 27
| 1:00 PM
| vs. #2 Boston College
| align=center|#18
| Times Union Center • Albany, New York (NCAA Northeast Regional semifinal)
| ESPNews
| colspan=5 rowspan=1 style="text-align:center"|Cancelled due to COVID-19 protocols

Scoring statistics

Goaltending statistics

Rankings

USCHO did not release a poll in week 20.

Awards and honors

Players drafted into the NHL

2021 NHL Entry Draft

† incoming freshman

References

External links

Notre Dame Fighting Irish men's ice hockey seasons
Notre Dame Fighting Irish
Notre Dame Fighting Irish
Notre Dame Fighting Irish
Notre Dame Fighting Irish
Notre Dame Fighting Irish